Kaslo Airport  is located  west of Kaslo, British Columbia, Canada.

References

Registered aerodromes in British Columbia
Regional District of Central Kootenay